The Man Who Could Be Santa is a Christmas book for children written by Emmy Award winning journalist Joanna Wolper. The book is published by Royal Fireworks Press.

Plot
The story is told from the point of view of 6¾-year-old Abby who insists she will believe in Santa Claus even when she is in “the hundredth grade.”

She and her cousins form a “spy club” to find out if the man who lives down the street with the long white beard, a "belly that shakes like jelly" and a bunch of reindeer in his front yard is the same person who slides down their chimneys every Christmas.

The three young detectives find other clues: a Christmas tree farm down the road, a ham radio that receives messages from the North Pole and remote control model air planes which deliver toys to children all over the world.

Language
The author, Joanna Wolper, used documentary film techniques to make certain the children’s dialogue was authentic. She conducted classroom workshops with over a hundred students in second, third and fourth grade classes.

The young students discarded what they called “parent words.” They  also discussed how they liked stories where they could  “escape to imaginary places that were safe.” They also wanted characters “who they could be friends with.” No matter where in the world the children came from they all wanted to believe in Santa Claus.

References

External links 
 The Man Who Could Be Santa
 Joanna Wolper on Conversations with Allan Wolper

2008 American novels
2008 children's books
American children's novels
Christmas novels
Christmas children's books